Spotlight on Jo Stafford is a 1996 compilation album of songs recorded by American singer Jo Stafford. It was released on January 23, 1996, and appears on both the Capitol and EMI labels.

Track listing

 "Just One of Those Things" (Cole Porter) - 2:42
 "I Didn't Know About You" 	 	
 "Walkin' My Baby Back Home"		 	
 "Too Marvelous for Words"		 	
 "In the Still of the Night"		 	
 "Autumn Leaves"		 	
 "Sugar"		 	
 "Haunted Heart"		 	
 "The Best Things in Life Are Free"		 	
 "The Boy Next Door"		 	
 "Sometimes I'm Happy"		 	
 "Fools Rush In"		 	
 "On the Sunny Side of the Street"		 	
 "I Remember You"		 	
 "Always True to You in My Fashion"		 	
 "La Vie en Rose"		 	
 "Over the Rainbow"		 	
 "I'll Be With You in Apple Blossom Time"

References

1996 compilation albums
Jo Stafford compilation albums
Capitol Records compilation albums
EMI Records compilation albums